Centaurea leptophylla, or Tamanyan's centaury, is a flowering plant in the family Asteraceae. The IUCN has classified the species as critically endangered.   

It is native to the Caucasus in Armenia.

Taxonomy 
It was named by  Mariam V. Agababjan, in: Biol. Zhurn. Arnz., 42(3): 187. in 1989.

References 

tamanianiae